The Legion of Super-Pets is a fictional team of superhero pets in the DC Universe. The original membership included Krypto the Superdog, Streaky the Supercat, Beppo the Super-Monkey, and Comet the Super-Horse, with the shape-shifting alien Proty II later joining. The team first appeared in Adventure Comics #293 (February 1962), although all of the members except for Comet had appeared individually in earlier issues. The group was removed from mainstream DC Comics continuity in 1986 but a new version appeared in mainstream comics in 2017.

The crossover series DC One Million in 1998 indicated that in the 853rd century a version of the team operates called the Justice Legion of Super-Zoomorphs. A follow-up story revealed that the universe of the 853rd century is protected by many teams representing the Legion of Super-Familiars, all of which are overseen by the Legion of Executive Familiars. It is unclear if the Justice Legion of Super Zoomorphs is one of these teams and simply adopted a unique name or is its own organization, similar to how the Legion of Super-Heroes and Legion of Substitute Heroes are similar teams, one inspired by the other, but operate separately unless a team-up is required.

Publication history
The first super-pet crossover story was published in Action Comics #277 (June 1961), "Battle of the Super-Pets", in which Krypto and Streaky competed with each other. The story ended with the surprise appearance of Beppo, who had appeared a couple of years earlier in Superboy.

Adventure Comics #293 (1962) featured the villainous Brain-Globe aliens threatening Superboy and the Legion of Super-Heroes. Krypto, Streaky, and Beppo are recruited, along with Comet who made his debut in the same issue. After the Brain-Globes are defeated, the team members go their separate ways but the comic book narration promised the Legion of Super-Pets would soon join forces again.

Significant appearances during the Legion's Adventure Comics run include issue #322 (July 1964) in which Proty II is initiated onto the team; issue #343 (April 1966) in which the Super-Pets help the Legion battle the Luck Lords; and issue #364 (January 1968), "The Revolt of the Super-Pets!"

The team only rarely appeared after the Silver Age and was removed from continuity by the reality-altering crossover Crisis on Infinite Earths, which was published from 1985-1986. Krypto as a super-powered dog became a recurring character in the Superman titles again following the 2000 storyline "Return to Krypton." Some of the other Super-Pets appeared in Post-Crisis comics in different forms. Traditional versions of Beppo and Comet appeared in issue #6 of Krypto the Superdog, an outside continuity comic series aimed at younger readers. A new official version of the Legion of Super-Pets made an appearance in the mainstream DC Comics universe in Super Sons Annual #1 in 2017.

In DC One Million #4 (1998), there is a group of super-powered animals living in the 853rd century (including a white horse wearing a version of the Superman S-shield) who were referred to as veterans of the Justice Legion of Super-Zoomorphs and were "led by Proty One Million and Master Mind" (the latter a possible descendant of the worm villain Mister Mind). DC 1 Million 80-Page Giant #1 (1999) introduced a group of super-powered animals in the 853rd century called the Legion of Super-Familiars. The story specifically says the team carries on the legacy of the Legion of Super-Pets and that there are many such legions on different worlds, all overseen by the Legion of Executive Familiars, led by Krypto-9.

Fictional background

Silver Age 
The last survivors of the planet Rambat, a group of alien Brain-Globes decide to move Earth to their own solar system and use it as a new home. They try to defeat Superboy, knowing the teenage hero of Smallville will oppose their plan. When they fail, they summon his friends Cosmic Boy, Lightning Lad, and Saturn Girl, the founders of the 30th century team of teenage champions called the Legion of Super-Heroes. Rambat mentally commands the trio to capture him. After the time-traveling teenagers succeed in capturing Superboy, the Brain-Globes release them from mental control.

The Legionnaires fear acting directly against the Brain-Globes, who might subvert their will again. Noticing the Brain-Globes cannot control the minds of animals or Superboy's Kryptonian dog Krypto, they decide to recruit other super-powered animals from across time for help. Knowing Superman's future, they recruit Streaky the Supercat, Beppo the Super-Monkey, and Comet the Super-Horse (who they knew would be a companion to Supergirl after she arrived on Earth years later). The pets defeat the aliens and Saturn Girl declares the group of animals will now be honored as the Legion of Super-Pets, a special branch of the Legion of Super-Heroes. They then return the animals to their proper time periods, not telling Superboy how the Brain-Globes were defeated since he shouldn't know too much about his own future, including people and animals he has yet to meet.

During one adventure in the 30th century, the Legion of Super-Heroes meet a Protean, a "protoplasmic" creature native to a planet in the Antares system. Proteans are simple but have intelligence, along with shape-shifting powers and limited telepathy. The Legionnaire called Chameleon Boy adopts him as a pet, naming him Proty. After Proty sacrifices his life to save Saturn Girl and Lightning Lad, Chameleon boy adopts another Protean as a new pet, naming him Proty II (though many just call him "Proty" as well). When the Legion of Super-Heroes later decides to challenge the villain Time Trapper, they recruit Superboy and the Legion of Substitute Heroes to join the effort. Nervous to leave their base unguarded, they have Superboy bring forth the Legion of Super-Pets to protect Legion HQ. Saturn Girl uses her telepathic powers to grants the animals their own limited telepathy so they can effectively communicate with each other and people. Proty II, left behind by Chameleon Boy, asks to join the team. After passing four challenges to show he can perform impressive feats even though his main power is shape-shifting, Proty II is officially welcomed into the LSP. Thanks to time travel technology, he is able to join the team on more adventures afterward.

The Legion of Super-Pets and their history were later removed from the canon of the mainstream DC Comics following the reality-altering crossover Crisis on Infinite Earths (1985-1985). The different animal members occasionally made other appearances in different stories.

DC Rebirth 
A new Legion of Super-Pets team appeared in the Post-DC Rebirth universe in Super Sons Annual #1 (2017). This roster includes Krypto, Titus (Damian Wayne's pet dog), Streaky, and the Bat-Cow (a cow with a bat-shaped patch over its eyes, previously introduced in Batman Inc.), along with two new animals making their first appearance in the story: Flexi the Plastic Bird (a parrot with Plastic Man's powers) and Clay Critter (a creature resembling Proty, possibly related to Clayface). Other members include Ch'p and B'dg (H'lvenites from the Green Lantern Corps), Solovar (a super-powered sapient gorilla from Gorilla City), the Terrific Whatzit (a turtle with the Flash's powers) Jumpa the Kanga (an Amazonian breed of kangaroo which was probably bred and originated in Themyscira, owned by Wonder Woman), Hoppy the Marvel Bunny (a rabbit with Captain Marvel's powers), Tawky Tawny (a sapient tiger, and a friend of Captain Marvel), Wonder Dog (Wendy and Marvin's pet dog), Rex the Wonder Dog, alongside his brother, Pooch (a pair of white shepherd dog brothers from the U.S. Army's K-9 Corps), Ace the Bat-Hound (Batman's dog originally owned by an engraver named John Wilker), Streak the Wonder Dog (Alan Scott's pet dog and sidekick companion), Fuzzy the Krypto Mouse (a mouse that was given super-powers – similar to Superman – by an unusual form of kryptonite), PB (a potbellied pig who can change size in scale, and another of Wonder Woman's pets), Mark, and Keith (a pair of guinea pigs; Mark is the brown one who possesses pyrokinesis, and is Cyborg's pet, while Keith is the white one who possesses cryokinesis (later hydrokinesis after Lulu (a hairless guinea pig who possesses flight and telekinesis, and is Mercy Graves' pet) smashes him against Mark), and is Aquaman's pet (actually all four characters from the CGI-animated film DC League of Super-Pets)).

The group is revealed to have secretly operated on several missions over the years (indicating that parts of their Silver Age history may be canon once more), but disbanded after a battle with Dex-Starr and Harley Quinn's hyenas Bud and Lou resulted in Clay Critter's apparent demise. Streaky evidently blamed Krypto for the loss of their teammate. In the Super Sons Annual #1 story, Krypto and Titus meet with Detective Chimp after realizing many dogs have gone missing. The two dogs reunite with Streaky, Bat-Cow and Flexi, and the group rescues the kidnapped dogs from an alien thief.

DC One Million
The crossover DC One Million introduced readers to a possible future in the 853rd century, where many solar systems were defended by heroes who either carried the legacy of modern-day DC heroes or were literal descendants, such as the Justice Legion-A. In DC One Million #4 (1998), super-powered animals appeared and were said to be "veterans" of the Justice Legion of Super-Zoomorphs who were being led into battle by "Proty One Million and Master Mind" (the latter a possible descendant of the worm villain Mister Mind).

The later one-shot issue DC 1 Million 80-Page Giant #1 introduced a coalition of different super-powered animal teams collectively known as the Legion of Super-Familiars, carrying on the legacy of the Legion of Super-Pets. Each planet of Earth's solar system in the 853rd century has its own local Legion of Super-Familiars team, all of which are organized and governed by the Legion of Executive Familiars, which includes Krypto-9 (descendant of Superman's dog Krypto), Octus the cephalopod from the Eighth Dimension, the worm teleporter Wormhole, and the twin sun-dogs Phaethon and Savitar. It is not made clear if the previously seen Justice Legion of Super-Zoomorphs is just one of the many Super-Familiars teams using a different name, an earlier version of the team, or a special team connected to the larger Legion of Super-Familiars, similar to how the Justice League occasionally co-exists with splinter groups such as the Justice League Task Force or how the Legion of Substitute Heroes is inspired by the Legion of Super-Heroes but operates independently unless a team-up is required.

Krypto-9, descendant of Superman's dog Krypto, explains the team's history in DC 1 Million 80-Page Giant #1. "Once they were masters and we were pets. Now we were recognized as full partners and designated familiars, an ancient referral to the bestial accomplice of the witch... Then came the great rebirth of mighty Solaris, and his patronage. He bequeathed universal telepathy on all animals and helped organize the super-familiars into legions."

In other media

Film
In July 2018, Jared Stern had been hired to write and direct a CGI-animated film based on the team. By January 2019, DC Films announced Super Pets with a scheduled release of May 21, 2021. Sam Levine was later hired as co-director. On May 22, 2019, the release date was delayed to May 20, 2022. A 10 second teaser was presented at the DC FanDome event in August 2020. On May 21, 2021, it was announced that actor Dwayne Johnson had been cast as the voice of Krypto the Superdog. For the film, the group's lineup of pets has been partially changed and it has been named the DC League of Super-Pets. Additional voice actors announced for the film include Keanu Reeves, Kevin Hart and John Krasinski. The titular League consists of Krypto, Ace the Bat-Hound, a pot-bellied pig named PB with size-shifting powers, the Terrific Whatzit, and Chip.

Miscellaneous 
The Legion of Super-Pets appear in the Robot Chicken episode "Tubba-Bubba's Now Hubba-Hubba", consisting of Comet, Streaky, Krypto, Beppo, and "Hissy the Super-Snake". Superman returns to the Fortress of Solitude from a month in space to find the pets have all frozen to death because their babysitter mistakenly thought she was watching them the month after.
The Legion of Super-Pets appear in the DC Nation short "Superman 75th Anniversary", consisting of Beppo the Super Monkey, Streaky the Supercat, and Krypto the Superdog.

See also
Lockjaw and the Pet Avengers

References

External links

Legion of Super-Pets at Cosmic Teams!
Hero History: Legion of Super-Pets

 
Animal superheroes
DC Comics animals
Legion of Super-Heroes
Characters created by Jerry Siegel
Characters created by Curt Swan
Comics characters introduced in 1962
DC Comics adapted into films